Xenotrachea is a genus of moths of the family Noctuidae.

Species
 Xenotrachea albidisca (Moore, 1867)
 Xenotrachea aurantiaca (Hampson, 1894)
 Xenotrachea auroviridis (Moore, 1867)
 Xenotrachea chrysochlora (Hampson, 1908)
 Xenotrachea leucopera (Hampson, 1908)
 Xenotrachea niphonica Kishida & Yoshimoto, 1979
 Xenotrachea tsinlinga (Draudt, 1950)

References
Natural History Museum Lepidoptera genus database
Xenotrachea at funet

Hadeninae